The 1996 Chicago Marathon was the 19th running of the annual marathon race in Chicago, United States and was held on October 20. The elite men's race was won by Britain's Paul Evans in a time of 2:08:52 hours and the women's race was won in 2:30:41 by Marian Sutton, also of Great Britain.

Results

Men

Women

References

Results. Association of Road Racing Statisticians. Retrieved 2020-04-10.

External links 
 Official website

Chicago Marathon
Chicago
1990s in Chicago
1996 in Illinois
Chicago Marathon
Chicago Marathon